Merník is a village and municipality in Vranov nad Topľou District in the Prešov Region of eastern Slovakia.

History
In historical records the village was first mentioned in 1363.

Geography
The municipality lies at an altitude of 165 metres and covers an area of 11.587 km². It has a population of about 626 people.

References

External links
 
 
https://web.archive.org/web/20071027094149/http://www.statistics.sk/mosmis/eng/run.html

Villages and municipalities in Vranov nad Topľou District